Rob Schoofs (born 23 March 1994) is a Belgian footballer who currently plays for KV Mechelen in the Belgian Pro League.
He is well known for his stint with AA Gent from 2016 until 2017.

Honours
Mechelen
 Belgian Cup: 2018–19

References

External links

1994 births
Living people
Belgian footballers
Belgium under-21 international footballers
Belgium youth international footballers
Sint-Truidense V.V. players
K.V. Mechelen players
Belgian Pro League players
Challenger Pro League players
Association football defenders
People from Sint-Truiden
Footballers from Limburg (Belgium)